Fengfeng Mining District is a district of the city of Handan, Hebei, People's Republic of China.

Administrative Divisions
Towns:
Linshui, Fengfeng Town, Xinpo, Dashe, Hecun, Yijing, Pengcheng, Jiecheng, Dayu

Climate

References

External links

County-level divisions of Hebei
Handan